Shane McAdam (born 28 May 1995) is an Australian rules footballer who plays for the Adelaide Crows in the Australian Football League (AFL). He is the nephew of former Australian rules footballers Gilbert McAdam, Adrian McAdam, and Greg McAdam.

Early football
McAdam played for the Claremont Football Club. He later played for the Sturt Football Club in the SANFL. He debuted for Sturt in the 1st round of the 2018 SANFL season. McAdam kicked 23 goals in his season with Sturt.

AFL career
McAdam was traded by Carlton to Adelaide in 2018, as a mature-aged pre-draft access selection, as part of a deal involving the trade of former Adelaide player Mitch McGovern. McAdam debuted in the Crows' thirty-seven point loss against the Brisbane Lions in the fourth round of the 2020 AFL season. On debut, McAdam picked up 5 disposals, 2 marks and 4 tackles.

Statistics
Statistics are correct to Round 23 2021

|- 
! scope="row" style="text-align:center" | 2019
|  || 23|| 0 || 0 || 0 || 0 || 0 || 0 || 0 || 0 || 0.0 || 0.0 || 0.0 || 0.0 || 0.0 || 0.0 || 0.0
|-
| scope="row" text-align:center | 2020
| 
| 23 || 13 || 12 || 12 || 79 || 43 || 122 || 47 || 38 || 0.9 || 0.9 || 6.0 || 3.3 || 9.4 || 3.6 || 2.9
|- 
| scope="row" text-align:center | 2021
| 
| 23 || 15 || 25 || 11 || 79 || 48 || 127 || 56 || 34 || 2.5 || 0.5 || 4.8 || 3.5 || 8.3 || 3.5 || 0.8
|- style="background:#EAEAEA; font-weight:bold; width:2em"
| scope="row" text-align:center class="sortbottom" colspan=3 | Career
| 28
| 37
| 23
| 158
| 91
| 249
| 103
| 72
| 1.3
| 0.8
| 5.6
| 3.2
| 8.8
| 3.6
| 2.5
|}

References

External links

1995 births
Living people
Adelaide Football Club players
Australian rules footballers from Western Australia
Sturt Football Club players
People educated at Hale School